David Soudry (born 1956) is a professor of mathematics at Tel Aviv University working in number theory and automorphic forms.

Career
Soudry was born in 1956. He received his PhD in mathematics from Tel Aviv University in 1983 under the supervision of Ilya Piatetski-Shapiro. From 1983 to 1984, he was a member of the Institute for Advanced Study. He is a professor of mathematics at Tel Aviv University.

Research
Together with Stephen Rallis and David Ginzburg, Soudry wrote a series of papers about automorphic descent culminating in their book The descent map from automorphic representations of GL(n) to classical groups. Their automorphic descent method constructs an explicit inverse map to the (standard) Langlands functorial lift and has had major applications to the analysis of functoriality.  Also, using the "Rallis tower property" from Rallis's 1984 paper on the Howe duality conjecture, they studied global exceptional correspondences and found new examples of functorial lifts.

Selected publications

References

External links
 

20th-century Israeli mathematicians
21st-century Israeli mathematicians
Number theorists
Living people
Date of birth missing (living people)
Place of birth missing (living people)
Tel Aviv University alumni
Academic staff of Tel Aviv University
Institute for Advanced Study visiting scholars
1956 births